Black salve, also known by the brand name Cansema, is a pseudoscientific alternative cancer treatment. The product is commonly classified as an escharotic—a topical paste which destroys skin tissue and leaves behind a scar called an eschar. Escharotics were widely used to treat skin lesions in the early 1900s, but have since been replaced by safer and more effective treatments. Escharotics, such as black salves, are currently advertised by some alternative medicine marketers as treatments for skin cancer, often with unsubstantiated testimonials and unsupported claims of effectiveness.

The U.S. Food and Drug Administration has listed Cansema as a "fake cancer cure" and warns consumers to avoid it.

Usages and dangers 

Cancer salves were first utilized during the Victorian period. As the medical profession started to gain better understanding, many home remedies, black salve as one example started to be criticized by medical professionals. An example of this is documented and labeled as a form of quackery in a 1955 Time magazine article:

They are not recommended as treatments for skin lesions or skin cancer by medical authorities, but are marketed as such by some alternative medicine practitioners. Use of escharotics, particularly when used instead of proven treatments, can be dangerous. The escharotic may not remove all of the cancerous cells, and frequently removes healthy tissue. Practitioners who use or sell escharotics frequently provide testimonials, in place of scientific evidence, to convince others of effectiveness and safety which does not exist. Safer and more effective treatments exist for skin cancers, such as: cryotherapy; topical agents such as imiquimod, fluorouracil and ingenol mebutate; radiation therapy; and surgical excision, including Mohs surgery (microscopically controlled surgery used to remove and test cancerous tissue).

Escharotics can cause serious scarring and damage to normal skin. Their manufacture is largely unregulated, so the strength and purity of marketed products are unknown and unverified. Numerous reports in the medical literature describe serious consequences of using escharotics in place of standard treatments for skin cancer, ranging from disfigurement to preventable cancer recurrences. The website Quackwatch warned against the use of escharotics in 2008, with a collection of sourced documents compiling issues of patient injury from their use. A more recent study revealed that many individuals who have used black salve were unaware of its potential dangers. In 2016, the American Academy of Dermatology urged patients to consult a dermatologist before using home remedies for skin cancers.

Furthermore, individuals increase their risk of further complications or death if they choose to delay conventional medical treatment to attempt treatment with black salve. In 2017, a patient with breast cancer posted photos and updates to a black salve research group as she progressed through her black salve applications. Despite her worsening condition, she truly believed that the black salve was going to cure her cancer. "And please no comments to see a doctor. I've been there. This is my path and I trust in it and my God who is healing me", she wrote. Eventually she sought conventional treatment, but died of a prolonged infection some months later.

It was reported in 2018 that the use of black salve had been expanded to include pets. In a Facebook group, people described the use of black salve on cats, dogs and horses.

In 2018, black salve was strongly linked to the death of Helen Lawson in Australia. Lawson covered her abdomen in black salve under the direction of Dennis Wayne Jensen, a self-proclaimed healer, who advised her that it would draw out her ovarian cancer. The black salve left Lawson with a mass of wounds on her abdomen, which became so large that surgeons could not operate on it within a few weeks. Lawson's sister-in-law described the wounds as extending from "above her pubic bone, all across her abdomen almost up to her rib cage", and as "raw, mutilated bubbling flesh". Lawson died in April 2018.

In 2019, Jensen was issued a prohibition order by the Health Complaints Commissioner of Victoria, forbidding him permanently from providing substances which "he (or anyone else) claims can cure or treat cancer or other serious disease or illness". This includes black salve.

Ingredients 

Common ingredients of black salves include zinc chloride, chaparral (also known as creosote bush), and often bloodroot, a plant frequently used in herbal medicine.
The extract of bloodroot is called sanguinarine, a quaternary benzophenanthridine alkaloid which attacks and destroys living tissue and is also classified as an escharotic.

Other formulations include the four ingredients: red clover, galangal, sheep sorrel, and bloodroot, crushed into a paste using mortar and pestle. Pseudoscientific practitioners advise that this is applied sparingly to the affected area, and kept covered for 2–3 days, although this treatment has not been proven to work for any medical application or to be safe.

Regulation

Australia 
The Therapeutic Goods Administration (TGA) of Australia is advising consumers against purchasing or using black salve, red salve or Cansema products. The TGA has found the Australian Vaccination-Skeptics Network (AVN) in breach of advertising regulations, and in a separate finding the AVN's former president Meryl Dorey together with Leon Pittard of Fair Dinkum Radio were found to be in breach.

United States 
Cansema is listed by the U.S. Food and Drug Administration (FDA) as one of 187 fake cancer cures. Cansema continues to be marketed by numerous individuals, as evidenced by recent FDA Warning Letters. The FDA has taken enforcement action against illegal marketing of Cansema as a cancer cure, as in the 2004 arrest and conviction of Greg Caton.

The FDA has taken an active role in the banning of these chemicals for use as a cancer cure. Typical warning letters detail the dangers of this product while also admonishing the purveyors of their obligation to comply with federal law. Summaries of recent letters are cataloged on the FDA website.

See also 
 List of ineffective cancer treatments

References

Further reading 
 Hurley D. Natural Causes: Death, Lies, and Politics in America's Vitamin and Herbal Supplement Industry. New York: Broadway Books, 2006.

External links 
 Escharotics information: New Zealand Dermatological Society
 "Bloodroot". Sloan-Kettering Cancer Center Herbal Database. Retrieved July 28, 2021.
 Escharotics information: Therapeutic Goods Administration
 Photo series illustrating harmful effects of black salve treatment.

Alternative medicine
Alternative cancer treatments
Pseudoscience